Said Tawfiq Khoury (‎) (June 6, 1923 - October 15, 2014) was a prominent Palestinian Christian entrepreneur and philanthropist. He was one of the three founders of Consolidated Contractors Company, currently based in Athens.  Khoury set up the business with his cousin Hasib Sabbagh in Beirut in 1952.

CCC is the largest construction company in the Middle East and ranks among the top 25 international contractors with a revenue of US$5.3 billion in 2013. CCC has offices and projects in over 40 countries, and a workforce of more than 130,000 employees. Khoury who is listed as a billionaire by Forbes is ranked 10th on the Arabian Business world's richest Arabs in 2013. Over the past few years, Khoury dedicated most of his time to the organisation he founded, The Bethlehem Development Foundation  that aims to rejuvenate the birthplace of Jesus Christ Bethlehem in Palestine, a holy city for Christians and Muslims alike actually located in the West Bank in the occupied Palestinian territory.

Personal life
Khoury was born in Safed, Mandatory Palestine in 1923. He was nourished in an atmosphere of strong family ties, pervasive moral influence, and a deep sense of ethnic and cultural diversity. After attending St. Luke's School in Haifa, he followed his cousin Hasib Sabbagh to Lebanon in order to study in the American University of Beirut, where both of them graduated from the faculty of engineering. Upon returning home, each of them founded a small construction company in Palestine.

After the establishment of the State of Israel, both men fled back again, this time with their families, to the capital of Lebanon, Beirut, where they began working on construction projects. Said and Sabbagh's first task was in the Tripoli airport. Khoury said they were motivated by the Nakba of Palestine "catastrophic expulsion from their homeland Palestine in 1948".

In the early 1950s a contract to construct a storage yard for oil pipes in Homs for the Iraq Petroleum Company introduced the young engineers to the world's largest construction company of that time, the Bechtel Group. The connection remained solid for many years, spearheading the CCC's extraordinary transformation from a small subcontracting construction company into the international giant it is today

Said has three sons and two daughters, from which he has fourteen grandchildren. While Said remains as the president of the CCC, his sons alongside the sons on Sabbagh are also at the helm of company.

He was a significant supporter of philanthropic activities in Palestine.

Achievements

Said Khoury held a Legion of Merit from the President of Lebanese Republic and a Legion of Unity from the President of the Republic of Yemen. He held as well as many other Medals of Merit and Honour from different parts of the World.

Said has sponsored the establishment of the Said Khoury Information Technology Center of Excellence (SKITCE) at Al-Quds University in Abu Dis.
Khoury received the HCEF Palestinian Diaspora Award given to individuals who have sustained commitment to revitalize Palestinian culture.

Positions and awards
Three medals from the Lebanese Government the first in 1976, the second in 2004 and the third in 2013
Medal Awarded to Mr. Said Khoury by the President of Lebanon وسام الاستحقاق اللبناني الى الدرجة الاولى ( المذهب ) 2014
The Bethlehem Star Award from President Arafat
The Jerusalem Star Award from President Mahmoud Abbas
Two Medals from the Russian Orthodox Church. One of them is the Cesar Daniel Boskoy's medal-Senior Officer-presented by Patriarch Alexei the Second 
Medal of Peter the Great -first class- from the Russian Federation
Medal from the Orthodox Church in Jerusalem
Golden Medal from the General Maronite Council
AUB Merit Award
Medal of St. Catherine's Order- Sinai
Medal of Archon Depurates from His All Holiness Ecumenical Patriarch Bartholomew

Honorary Doctorates
The American University of Beirut
The Lebanese American University
 The Birzeit University
The Russian Federation Academy of Security, Defense, Law & Order
The Medical Foundation of Kazakhstan

Current positions
Governor of Palestine in the Arab Monetary Fund
Chairman of the Board of International Business Group (IBG)*Chairman of the Board of “Al Iktissad Wal-Aamal” in Lebanon
Chairman of the Board of Palestine Electric Company, Gaza
Chairman of the Board of Palestinian Student Fund.
Honorary – Chairman of the Board of Trustees of the Welfare Association, Geneva 
Honorary Chairman of the Board of Trustees of the Institute of the Palestinian Studies in Beirut
 Honorary Chairman of the Board of Trustees of Al Sakakini Cultural Center
Member of the Board of Trustees of the Greek Orthodox Archdiocese of Antioch in Western & Central Europe
Member of the Board of Trustees of the Palestinian Initiative for the Promotion of Global Dialogue & Democracy – Miftah
Member of the Board of Trustees of the Bethlehem Foundation-Washington, D.C.
Member of the Board of Trustees of the Institute of Palestinian Studies-Beirut, Lebanon
Member of the Board of Trustees of the Greek Orthodox Archidiocese of Antioch in Western & Central Europe.

Member of the Board of Directors
Bank Audi, Beirut
Canvest Corporation N.V., Canada
Deputy chair of the Arab Life & Accident Insurance Co. Jordan

See also
Palestinian Christians

References

External links
 Interview with Pan-Arabic Newspaper Asharq Al-Awsat (In Arabic.)
 2013 Construction Week Power 100
 Said Khoury
 Said T. Khoury

Businesspeople from Beirut
American University of Beirut alumni
Palestinian businesspeople
Members of the Greek Orthodox Church of Antioch
Eastern Orthodox Christians from Palestine
Palestinian Christians
2014 deaths
1923 births